God's Clay is a 1919 British silent drama film directed by Arthur Rooke and starring Janet Alexander, Humberston Wright and Maud Yates. It is an adaptation of the novel God's Clay by Claude Askew and Alice Askew. The story was adapted for a 1928 film God's Clay directed by Graham Cutts.

Plot
A respectable woman's position in society is threatened by a blackmailer.

Cast
 Janet Alexander as Angela Clifford
 Humberston Wright as Geoffrey Vance
 Maud Yates as Poppy Stone
 Arthur Rooke as Horace Newton
 Nancy Kenyon
 Adeline Hayden Coffin
 J. Hastings Batson

References

External links

1919 films
British silent feature films
1919 drama films
1910s English-language films
Films directed by Arthur Rooke
Films based on British novels
British drama films
British black-and-white films
1910s British films
Silent drama films